Kalenborn is an Ortsgemeinde – a municipality belonging to a Verbandsgemeinde, a kind of collective municipality – in the Cochem-Zell district in Rhineland-Palatinate, Germany. It belongs to the Verbandsgemeinde of Kaisersesch, whose seat is in the like-named town.

Geography 

The municipality lies in the Eifel about 4 km northwest of Kaisersesch.

History 
Beginning in 1794, Kalenborn lay under French rule. In 1815 it was assigned to the Kingdom of Prussia at the Congress of Vienna. Since 1946, it has been part of the then newly founded state of Rhineland-Palatinate.

Politics

Municipal council 
The council is made up of 6 council members, who were elected by majority vote at the municipal election held on 7 June 2009, and the honorary mayor as chairman.

Mayor 
Kalenborn's mayor is Werner Arenz, and his deputies are Toni Thelen and Erwin Groß.

Coat of arms 
The municipality's arms might be described thus: Tierced in mantle, dexter vert three ears of wheat, one palewise surmounted by another bendwise sinister, itself surmounted by another palewise to dexter of the first, all Or, sinister gules a well pump argent, and in base Or a tower masoned sable with a conical roof of the third.

Culture and sightseeing 

The following are listed buildings or sites in Rhineland-Palatinate’s Directory of Cultural Monuments:
 Hauptstraße – old school; with teacher's dwelling, from 1909
 northeast of Kalenborn, before a chapel – basalt milestone, second fourth of the 19th century

References

External links 

Collective municipality’s webpages 

Cochem-Zell